Vares: Private Eye is a 2004 Finnish crime film directed by Aleksi Mäkelä. It is based on the eleventh Vares novel Keltainen leski (1999) by Reijo Mäki. The setting is Turku, a city on the west coast of Finland. It stars Juha Veijonen as private detective Jussi Vares who investigates a case involving a large amount of dirty money. The film is the first of nine films in the Vares series. The first sequel, V2: Dead Angel, was released in 2007.

Cast 
 Juha Veijonen as Jussi Vares
 Laura Malmivaara as Eeva Sunila
 Samuli Edelmann as Mikko Koitere
 Pekka Valkeejärvi as Jari "Hillosilmä" Munck
 Kari Hietalahti as Tetsuo Sinkkonen
 Jorma Tommila as Antero Kraft
 Minna Turunen as Ifigenia Multanen
 Jari Halonen as Karl E. Miesmann
 Markku Peltola as Luusalmi
 Jasper Pääkkönen as Jarmo
 Santeri Kinnunen as Touko Reiman
 Heli Sutela as Liisa, Eeva's friend
 Georges Copeloussis as Gennadi Antipov
 Topias Tanska as Jaakko

References

External links 
 

2004 action thriller films
2000s crime thriller films
Finnish detective films
Films based on thriller novels
Films directed by Aleksi Mäkelä
Films set in Finland
Films shot in Finland
Films based on Finnish novels
Finnish action films
Finnish crime films
Finnish thriller films